Paulus Jan Lotsij (4 February 1880 in Dordrecht – 19 September 1910 in Amsterdam) was a Dutch rower who competed in the 1900 Summer Olympics.

He was part of the Dutch boat Minerva Amsterdam, which won the silver medal in the coxed fours final B.

He is the younger brother of Geert Lotsij.

References

External links

 profile

1880 births
1910 deaths
Dutch male rowers
Olympic rowers of the Netherlands
Rowers at the 1900 Summer Olympics
Olympic silver medalists for the Netherlands
Sportspeople from Dordrecht
Olympic medalists in rowing
Medalists at the 1900 Summer Olympics